Eugène Cattin (21 January 1866 – 8 May 1947) was a Swiss mail carrier and photographer from Les Bois. He's known for photographs of his home region.

Career 

During his postman's round, by horse riding or by bicycle, Eugène Cattin photographed his home region and its inhabitants. He realized more than  shots on photographic plate, mostly outside, that represent everyday life of the Franches-Montagnes. His photographs are conserved by the Archives cantonales jurassiennes, which uploaded this collection on Wikimedia Commons in 2016.

References

Bibliography 
 

1866 births
1947 deaths
Swiss photographers